Ten Jinn is a California progressive rock band. The band was formed in 1991 by John Paul Strauss and drummer Jimmy Borel (who is no longer with the band). Happy the Man guitarist Stan Whitaker joins the band on the As On A Darkling Plain album. 

Their sound has been compared to Echolyn, Salem Hill, Jethro Tull, Saga, and Spock's Beard, and includes the styles of rock music, progressive rock, and Canterbury.

Albums include:
 Wildman
 As On A Darkling Plain (based on the vampire novels of Anne Rice)
 Alone
 Sisyphus
 Ziggy Blackstar (A Tribute To David Bowie)

References

Progressive rock musical groups from California